The Sikkimese bent-toed gecko (Cyrtodactylus gubernatoris) is a   species of gecko found in Darjeeling, India.

References
 Annandale, N. 1913 The Indian geckos of the genus Gymnodactylus. Records of the Indian Museum, 9: 309–326.
 Rösler, H. 2000 Kommentierte Liste der rezent, subrezent und fossil bekannten Geckotaxa (Reptilia: Gekkonomorpha). Gekkota 2: 28-153

External links
 

Cyrtodactylus
Reptiles described in 1913